Smích se lepí na paty is a 1986 Czechoslovak film. The film starred Josef Kemr.

References

External links
 

1986 films
Czechoslovak comedy films
1980s Czech-language films
Czech comedy films
1980s Czech films